Kristian Kjærlund is a Danish singer who became the winner of the twelfth season of the Danish version of the X Factor.

Performances during X Factor

Discography

Singles
 "Lost and Profound" (2019)
  "Where's The Show1" (2019)
  "Anywhere" (2019)

EPs

References

External links

Danish male singers
Living people
People from Horsens Municipality
1996 births